Mahjouba, Tunisia is  a place in the Sahel, Tunisia regionof North Africa 54 km from Carthage. It is near Mateur and is the site of a fault line

History
During the Byzantine and Roman Empires it was known as Tituli and was in the Roman province of Africa Proconsularis. The town was also  the seat of an ancient Christian bishopric, which although  ceasing to function with the Muslim conquest of the Maghreb, survives today as a titular see of the Roman Catholic Church.

See also
Mahjouba, Morocco

References

Catholic titular sees in Africa
Roman towns and cities in Tunisia